The 1975–76 London Spartan League season was the 58th in the history of Spartan League, and the first as London Spartan League. The league consisted of 33 teams.

Division One

The division featured 16 teams.
 8 came from last season's Spartan League
 Farnborough Town  (1st)
 Chertsey Town  (2nd)
 Hoddesdon Town  (4th)
 Banstead Athletic  (5th)
 Berkhamsted Town  (6th)
 Bracknell Town  (7th)
 Kingsbury Town  (9th)
 Farnham Town  (11th)
 8 came from last season's Metropolitan–London League
 Cray Wanderers  (1st)
 Alma Swanley  (2nd)
 Swanley Town (4th)
 Penhill Standard (6th)
 Hatfield Town (7th)
 Chingford  (8th)
 Heathside Sports (9th)
 East Ham United  (10th)

League table

Division Two

The division featured 17 teams.
 4 came from last season's Spartan League
 Crown & Manor (13th)
 Chalfont St. Peter  (14th)
 Frimley Green  (15th)
 Amersham Town  (16th)
 10 came from last season's Metropolitan–London League
 Highfield  (11th)
 East Thurrock United  (12th)
 BROB Barnet (13th)
 Muirhead Sports (14th)
 Bexley (15th)
 Barkingside  (16th)
 Thames Polytechnic (17th)
 Ulysses  (18th)
 Brentstonians, also known as Brent (19th)
 RAS & RA, also known as Royal Arsenal S & R A  (20th)
 2 came from Surrey Senior League
 Virginia Water
 Whyteleafe
 1 came from South East London Amateur League
 Beckenham Town

No trace of a Division Two table has been found.

At the end of the season,
 the following 4 clubs were promoted to Division One:  
 BROB Barnet
 Frimley Green
 Highfield
 Virginia Water
 the following club left the league:
 Muirhead Sports
 the following club were promoted to Athenian League Division Two
 Chalfont St. Peter

References

1975–76
9